Mesfen Tesfaye (born 1929) was an Ethiopian cyclist. He competed in the individual and team road race events at the 1956 Summer Olympics.

References

External links
 

1929 births
Year of death missing
Ethiopian male cyclists
Olympic cyclists of Ethiopia
Cyclists at the 1956 Summer Olympics
Place of birth missing